The 15th Artistic Gymnastics World Championships were held on July 3–8, 1962 in Prague, the capital of Czechoslovakia, this being the 3rd time that Prague hosted these championships.

These were the last championships China competed in until 1979. Following a 1964 vote to accept Taiwan as a member nation, China withdrew from the International Gymnastics Federation in protest. They would not rejoin until 1978.

Medallists

Men's results

Team competition

Individual all-around

Floor exercise

Pommel horse

Rings

Vault

Parallel Bars

Horizontal Bar

Women's results

Team competition

Individual all-around

Vault

Uneven bars

Balance beam

Floor exercise

Medal table

References

 www.gymn-forum.net (Archived 2009-09-03)

World Artistic Gymnastics Championships
World Artistic Gymnastics Championships
1962 in gymnastics
International gymnastics competitions hosted by Czechoslovakia